Helgesen is a surname. Notable people with the surname include:
Finn Helgesen (born 1919) Norwegian speed skater
Poul Helgesen Danish Carmelite 
Henry Thomas Helgesen (1857–1917) American Representative from North Dakota
Sverre Helgesen (1903–1981) Norwegian high jumper
Hermann Helgesen (1889–1963) Norwegian gymnast
Hans Lars Helgesen (1831-1918) 
George Helgesen Fitch (1877-1915) American author
Gunn Marit Helgesen (born 1958) Norwegian politician

See also
Helgerson